Vertical Blue is a freediving competition which has been held annually in The Bahamas at Dean's Blue Hole since April 2008 by freediving world record holder William Trubridge.  It is an AIDA International or CMAS in 2021 judged competition and has been the venue for multiple world and national records for athletes coming from countries all over the world.

Description
Vertical Blue is a depth competition which consists of the freediving depth disciplines of free immersion (FIM), Constant weight without fins (CNF) and Constant weight (CWT).

The event is held at Dean's Blue Hole on Long Island in the Bahamas and is organized by William Trubridge with AIDA International providing judges.

Vertical Blue is also the name of the freediving school operated by  William Trubridge at Dean's Blue Hole.

History

Vertical Blue 2008
Vertical Blue 2008 was announced in February 2008 and was held from 1 to 11 April in the same year.  It was attended by competitors from Brazil, Canada, Columbia, France, Japan, New Zealand, the Russian Federation, Switzerland and the United States.  A total of 23 national and 3 world records were achieved.

Vertical Blue 2009
Vertical Blue 2009 was held from 1 to 9 April 2009 and was attended by competitors from Austria, Australia, Brazil, Canada, Colombia, Denmark, France, Italy, Japan, New Zealand, Tunisia, the United Kingdom and the United States.

Vertical Blue 2013
On November 17, 2013, American freediver Nicholas Mevoli died after attempting to set an American record during a Vertical Blue competition at Dean's Blue Hole.

References

External links
Vertical Blue official webpage
 Deeper Blue Article about Vertical Blue 2008

Freediving
Sports competitions in the Bahamas